Ambulyx charlesi is a species of moth in the family Sphingidae. It was described by Benjamin Preston Clark in 1924 and is known from Indonesia.

References

Ambulyx
Moths described in 1924
Moths of Indonesia